Windlesham House School is an independent boarding and day school for boys and girls aged 4 to 13 on the South Downs, in Pulborough, West Sussex, England. It was founded in 1837 by Charles Robert Malden and was the first boys' preparatory school in the United Kingdom. In 1967 it became the first IAPS co-educational school. The school moved to its current location in 1934. It caters for over 300 pupils. Children aged 4 to 7 are taught in the pre-prep.

From 2011 onward, the school has been inspected by the Independent Schools Inspectorate, who awarded it 'excellent' in its 2017 report. The school received an 'outstanding' award in its Ofsted inspection in 2010.

Boarding and Pastoral Care 

Male and female students are accommodated in dormitories based in separate areas of the school. Each wing is run by the Heads of Boarding, who are supported by matrons. The dorms vary in size and children sleep in bunk beds or single beds. Each wing of the boarding house has a 'comfy' room, much like a common room, for recreational use outside of lesson times.

There are six houses, each of which are led by 'houseparents', one male and one female, that provide limited pastoral care for the children. These houseparents are key contacts between the headmaster, the head of pastoral care and the parents. In addition, each student has a personal tutor and subject teachers.

The school has an international presence, with over 15 nationalities represented by its students. Mobile phones are not allowed, but the boarding houses have phones for calling home and access to Skype for students with parents based overseas.

In the 2017 ISI inspection, the boarding facilities were judged to be of an excellent quality.

Charles and Elizabeth Ann Malden were the last of five generations of Malden heads from 1837. Their joint headship lasted nearly 40 years (1957 to 1994). They were leaders of their time, insisting on being known not by their surname, Malden, but by the more informal Mr and Mrs Charles. In 1963 the School was among the first to become a trust and in 1967 Windlesham was the first traditional boys' boarding prep school to become co-educational.

The Headmaster, Ben Evans took over from Richard Foster in September 2020. The chair of the Board of Governors is Douglas Moody-Stuart and the Deputy Head is Andy Nuttall.

School Facilities 

The school has been recognised for its school grounds and facilities available to the students. The school has a 9-hole golf course, playing fields and woodland that the children are allowed to play in. Bush craft and survival lessons are often taken in the woodland. The sports facilities are extensive, with an astro pitch, tennis courts, netball courts, athletics track and sports fields that cater for cricket, football, rugby and hockey.

In 2014 a new playground was opened by Lord Denman after the Parents Association raised money for its construction. Additionally, their work enabled them to donate £3,000 to Cystic Fibrosis, Cardiac Support, Sanchat Charitable Trust, Worthing Food Bank, Sussex Autistic Society and Canine Partners.

In 2015 the school applied for permission to begin the phase of the expansion of its sports facilities. This was completed in February 2018. The new sports and swimming building incorporates a 25-metre six-lane swimming pool and four indoor playing courts with supporting rooms. It also has areas for spectators watching basketball, hockey, tennis and badminton. There will also be male and female changing rooms, boot rooms and storage areas for the project. The project was undertaken by Kier construction. In July 2018 the complex was awarded 'Highly Commended' at the Sussex Heritage Trust Awards.

Curriculum 

The school does not follow standardised tests. However, in the 2017 Independent Schools Inspectorate data from the school were seen to indicate that the majority of the students were working above the national average.

Uniform 

The School does not have a uniform, but rather a dress code in place.

Headship
The headship of Windlesham remained within the Malden family for 157 years spanning five generations. From its founding in 1837 until 1994 each headmaster had been the son of his predecessor, with the exception of Grace Scott Malden, who succeeded her husband, and Charles Christopher Malden, whose elder brother, Roger, led the school while he completed his national service and degree.

1837–1855 Lieutenant Charles Robert Malden, RN
1855–1888 Major Henry Charles Malden
1888–1896 Charles Scott Malden
1896–1927 Grace Gilbert Scott Malden
1927–1953 Christopher Scott-Malden, as principal, with a subordinate headmaster
1953–1957 Lieutenant-Colonel Roger William Malden
1957–1994 Charles Christopher and Elizabeth Ann Malden, jointly
1994–1995 Ian and Margaret Angus, jointly
1995–1996 Stephen and Julie Goodhart, as acting heads, jointly
1996–2006 Philip Lough
2006–2007 Paul Forte, as acting headmaster
2007–2020 Richard Foster
2020– Ben Evans, formerly headmaster of Edge Grove School
Christopher Scott-Malden, who had expected to run the school in partnership with his more scholarly elder brother, Gilbert, structured his role as principal, appointing subordinate headmasters. Gilbert held the title of Head Master between 1914 and 1921, but in a subordinate role to his mother, Grace.

Both Grace Scott Malden and Elizabeth Ann Malden were known to the pupils as 'Mrs Charles', a tradition that stretches back to 1880 when Charles Scott Malden was styled as 'Mr. Charles' to distinguish him from his father, 'Mr. (Henry) Malden'.

Notable former pupils (ordered by date of birth)

Former pupils are traditionally known as Old Windleshamites, though the term 'OWLs' (Old Windlesham Leavers) has been used by the school in recent years.

Lieutenant Colonel Charles Ichabod Wright (1828–1905), banker and Conservative politician
Professor Reverend Walter Shirley (1828–1866), priest and historian
William John Monson, 1st Viscount Oxenbridge, PC (1828–1900), Liberal politician and Captain of the Queen's bodyguard
Major Henry Charles Malden (1829–1907), notable for his role in the standardisation of the laws of association football. Windlesham's first pupil and second headmaster
Debonnaire John Monson, 8th Baron Monson, KCVO (1830–1900), Sergeant-at-Arms to Queen Victoria
Sir John Edward Dorington, 1st Bt., PC, DL (1832–1911), Conservative politician
Gerald Vesey (1832–1915), Archdeacon of Huntington
Ross Lowis Mangles, VC (1833–1905), first civilian recipient of the Victoria Cross
Roden Noel (1834–1894), poet
Ronald Leslie-Melville, 11th Earl of Leven, KT, PC, DL (1835–1906), Scottish peer and Keeper of the Privy Seal of Scotland
Saumarez Smith (1836–1909), Archbishop of Sydney
Sir Frederick Albert Bosanquet, KC, JP (1837–1923), lawyer and Common Serjeant of London
Sir William Hart Dyke, 7th Bt., PC, DL, JP (1837–1931), Conservative politician, 1862 World Rackets Champion and tennis pioneer
Admiral Sir Robert More-Molyneux, GCB (1838–1904), Royal Navy officer and President of the Royal Naval College, Greenwich
Sir Lepel Griffin, KCSI (1838–1908), writer and diplomat of the British Raj
Sir Edmund Verney, 3rd Bt., FRGS, DL, JP (1838–1910), Royal Navy officer, author and Liberal politician
Leveson Francis Vernon-Harcourt, MICE (1839–1907), civil engineer
Henry Brudenell-Bruce, 5th Marquess of Ailesbury (1842–1911), soldier, businessman and Conservative politician
Joseph Herbert Tritton (1844–1923), banker
George Carnac Fisher (1844–1921), Bishop of Southampton
Admiral Swinton Colthurst Holland (1844–1922), Royal Navy officer
Hubert Thomas Knox, MRIA, FRSAI (1845–1921), Irish historian
Sir Henry Bellingham, 4th Bt. (1846–1921), Conservative politician
Sir Andrew Agnew, 9th Bt., JP (1850–1928), Liberal Unionist politician
Herbert Lawford (1851–1925), Scottish tennis player, 1887 Wimbledon champion
Major Edward Hay Mackenzie Elliot (1852–1920), soldier and England footballer
Alexander Wallace Rimington, ARE, RBA, Hon. FSA (1853–1918), etcher, painter, illustrator and author
St John Brodrick, 1st Earl of Midleton, KP, PC, DL (1856–1942), Conservative politician and Secretary of State for War during the Second Boer War
Lieutenant General Sir William Pitcairn Campbell, KCB (1856–1933), British general during World War I and Aide-de-Camp to King Edward VII
George Ulick Browne, 6th Marquess of Sligo (1856–1935), Irish soldier and peer
Sir John Barlow, 1st Bt. (1857–1932), Liberal politician
Percy Melmoth Walters (1863–1936), England football captain
Arthur Melmoth Walters (1865–1941), England footballer
Lieutenant General Sir Sydney Turing Barlow Lawford, KCB (1865–1953), British general and father of 'Rat Pack' actor Peter Lawford
Arthur Browne, 8th Marquess of Sligo, KBE (1867–1951), Irish soldier and peer and Principal Assistant Secretary to the Imperial War Graves Commission
Richard Heywood (1867–1955), Bishop of Mombasa
Admiral of the Fleet Sir Osmond Brock, GCB, KCMG, KCVO (1869–1947), commander of HMS Princess Royal and the 1st Battlecruiser Squadron at the Battle of Jutland
Lieutenant Colonel Sir Alexander Leith, 1st Bt., MC (1869–1956), British benefactor
Rennie MacInnes (1870–1931), Bishop of Jerusalem
Alnod Boger (1871–1940), first-class cricketer
Arthur Dunbar Whatman (1873–1965), cricketer
Frederick Waldegrave Head, MC & Bar (1874–1941), twice-decorated Senior Chaplain to the Guards Division during World War I and Archbishop of Melbourne
Ian Hannah (1874–1944), academic, writer and Conservative politician
Arthur Baillie Lumsdaine Karney (1874–1963), first Bishop of Johannesburg, later Bishop of Southampton
Harry Wrightson (1874–1919), Conservative politician, notable for dying before he could take his seat in Parliament
Elliot James Dowell Colvin (1885–1950), Prime Minister of Jammu and Kashmir
Guy Kindersley (1876–1956), Conservative politician
J. I. Wedgwood (1883–1951), first Presiding Bishop of the Liberal Catholic Church
Archibald Bentley Beauman (1888–1977), British Army officer
Lionel Bostock, OBE, MC (1888–1962), first-class cricketer and British Army officer
Sutton Vane (1888–1963), British playwright
James Philip Mills (1890–1960), civil servant and ethnographer
Claud Lovat Fraser (1890–1921), artist, designer and author
Philip Sargant Florence (1890–1982), American economist
Christopher Scott-Malden (1890–1956), first-class cricketer and Windlesham's fifth headmaster
Hon. Freddie Calthorpe (1892–1935), first-class cricketer
Lieutenant-Colonel Dick Rawlinson, OBE (1894–1984), intelligence officer in both world wars and peacetime film producer and screenwriter
Major John Roland Abbey (1894–1969), prolific English book collector, High Sheriff of Sussex and British Army Officer
Donald Howard Beves (1896–1961), academic
Robert Grimston, 1st Baron Grimston of Westbury (1897–1979), Conservative politician
Hilary Saint George Saunders (1898–1951), British Army officer, author and historian
Major Sir Charles Buchanan, 4th Bt. (1899–1984), British Army officer and High Sheriff of Nottinghamshire
Kenneth Gandar-Dower (1908–1944), sportsman, aviator, explorer and author
Sir Michael Hordern, CBE (1911–1995), actor
John Davies, MBE (1916–1979), Conservative politician and Director-General of the Confederation of British Industry. Father of Frank Davies (q.v., born 1946)
Prince Emanuel Vladimirovich Galitzine (1918–2002), Spitfire pilot and member of the Russian royal family
Chris Tyler (1938–2016), surfing entrepreneur
James Hamilton-Paterson (born 1941), poet and novelist
Frank Davies (born 1946), Anglo-Canadian record producer. Son of John Davies, MBE (q.v., born 1916)
John Michie (born 1956), actor
Duncan Goodhew, MBE (born 1957), swimming athlete and Olympic gold medalist
Dr Martha Holmes (born 1961), BAFTA Award-winning producer of wildlife documentaries
Alexandra Hall Hall (born 1964), diplomat
Andrew Page (born 1965), diplomat
Professor Chris Whitty (born 1966), Chief Medical Officer to the UK Government
Sophie Darlington (born 1966), BAFTA award-winning wildlife filmmaker and cinematographer
Guy Ritchie (born 1968), film director, producer and screenwriter, married to Madonna 2000–2008
Frances Osborne (born 1969), author, married to George Osborne 1998–2019
Adam Buxton (born 1969), actor and comedian
Gabriel Weston (born 1970), surgeon, author and television presenter
Polly Renton (1970–2010), documentary film-maker
Tina Cook (born 1970), three-time Olympic medalist event rider and 2009 European Champion
Noah Huntley (born 1974), actor
Alex Chalk MP (born 1976), Conservative politician, MP for Cheltenham
Tom Hiddleston (born 1981), actor
Jacquetta Wheeler (born 1981), fashion model
Tom Williams (born 1983), English rugby union player
Georgia Hardinge (born 1984), fashion designer
Ted Dwane (born 1984), musician, bassist of Mumford & Sons
Thom Evans (born 1985), Scottish international rugby union player
Alfie Allen (born 1986), actor
Lucy Griffiths (born 1986), actor
Alan Pownall (born 1986), singer/songwriter, married to Gabriella Wilde (q.v., born 1989)
Tamzin Merchant (born 1987), actress
Gabriella Wilde (born 1989), actress and model, married to Alan Pownall (q.v., born 1986)

References

Further reading

External links
Official Website

Educational institutions established in 1837
Preparatory schools in West Sussex
1837 establishments in England